Agathia gigantea is a species of moth of the family Geometridae first described by Arthur Gardiner Butler in 1880. It is found in Java, Sumatra, Peninsular Malaysia and Borneo.

External links

Geometrinae
Insects of Borneo
Moths of Asia